Colton Fraser LeBlanc (born 1992) is a Canadian politician, representing the electoral district of Argyle-Barrington as a member of the Progressive Conservative Association of Nova Scotia caucus.

Early life and education
Raised in Quinan, Nova Scotia, LeBlanc graduated from Université Sainte-Anne in 2013 with a Bachelor of Science Degree.

Before politics
LeBlanc worked as a paramedic for five years before running for political office.

Political career
LeBlanc was elected to the Nova Scotia House of Assembly in a by-election on September 3, 2019.

On August 7, 2021, LeBlanc helped save a man's life when he collapsed at a local community festival in Yarmouth County.

On August 31, 2021, LeBlanc was made Minister of the Public Service Commission, Service Nova Scotia and Internal Services, and Acadian Affairs and Francophonie.

Bills introduced

Election record

2021 election

2019 by-election

References

Living people
Progressive Conservative Association of Nova Scotia MLAs
Members of the Executive Council of Nova Scotia
People from Yarmouth County
21st-century Canadian politicians
1992 births